Dan Berglund (born 5 May 1963) is a Swedish musician who mainly plays the upright bass and is known within jazz and fusion.

Biography

Berglund was familiar with Swedish folk music as well as with pop and rock music. At the age of ten he started playing rock guitar, but later changed to bass guitar. As part of his musical training at the Birka Folkhögskola in Östersund he came to pick up the upright bass and played in the regional symphony orchestra, with whom he also had guest performances and first television appearances. In 1990 he moved to Stockholm to study at the Kungliga Musikhögskolan. There he played in the group  Jazz Furniture  and in the quintet of Lina Nyberg, where he met Esbjörn Svensson.

From 1993 he was a member of the highly successful Esbjörn Svensson Trio, with whom he recorded numerous albums and toured worldwide. He was a member of the trio until the death of Svensson in 2008. In 2009 he founded his own crossover band Tonbruket, which includes Johan Lindström (guitar, keyboards), Martin Hederos (piano, accordion, violin, keyboards) and Andreas Werliin (drums, percussion), who do not come from the jazz scene. The band's 2009 debut album was awarded a Swedish Grammy.

Selected discography

Solo
With Tonbruket
 2009: Dan Berglund's Tonbruket (ACT Music)
 2010: Dig It to the End (ACT Music) (awarded Gyllene Skivan 2011)
 2013: Nubium Swimtrip (ACT Music)
 2016: Forevergreens (ACT Music)
 2018: Live Salvation (ACT Music) (Recorded live in Stuttgart, November 17, 2016)
 2019: Masters of Fog (ACT Music)

Collaborations
With Esbjörn Svensson Trio
See Esbjörn Svensson Trio#Discography

With Jeanette Lindström Quintet
 1995: Another Country (Caprice Records)
 1997: I Saw You (Caprice Records)

With Fire! Orchestra
 2013: Exit! (Rune Grammofon)
 2014: Enter (Rune Grammofon)
 2014: Second Exit (Rune Grammofon)

With others
 1992: City Sounds (Mirrors Records), with Fredrik Norén Band
 1994: Jazz Furniture (Caprice Records), with Jazz Furniture
 1994: When The Smile Shines Through (Prophone), with Lina Nyberg
 1998: Alla Mina Kompisar (EMI Music), with Per "Texas" Johansson
 1999: Melos (Sittel Records), with Peter Asplund
 2008: Love Is Real (ACT Music), with Ulf Wakenius as composer
 2011: Bitter and Sweet (Emoción Records), with Jessica Pilnäs
 2013: Cause And Effect (Prophone), with Peter Johannesson, Schultz, Berglund feat. Jacob Karlzon
 2014: Trialogue (Jazzland Recordings), with Bugge Wesseltoft, Henrik Schwarz
 2019: Reflections & Odysseys (Jazzland Recordings), with Bugge Wesseltoft and Magnus Öström (Rymden)
 2020: Doom Country (Startracks), with Christian Kjellvander (Tonbruket)

References

External links

 
 Biography (ACT)
 Meeting Dan Berglund's Tonbruket  
 

1963 births
Living people
Swedish jazz composers
Male jazz composers
Swedish jazz double-bassists
ACT Music artists
People from Jämtland
21st-century double-bassists
21st-century Swedish male musicians
Esbjörn Svensson Trio members